Torre di Santa Maria is a comune (municipality) in the Province of Sondrio in the Italian region Lombardy, located about  northeast of Milan and about  north of Sondrio.

The municipality of Torre di Santa Maria contains the frazioni (subdivisions, mainly villages and hamlets) Prato, Sant'Anna, and Tornadù.

Torre di Santa Maria borders the following municipalities: Berbenno di Valtellina, Buglio in Monte, Caspoggio, Castione Andevenno, Chiesa in Valmalenco, Montagna in Valtellina, Postalesio, Sondrio, Spriana.

Demographic evolution

References

External links
 www.comune.torredisantamaria.so.it

Cities and towns in Lombardy